Fan Expo Dallas, previously known as Dallas Comic Con (or DCC for short), is a three-day speculative fiction, (including comic books and gaming) fan convention held annually in the Dallas, Texas area. Larger in scale than the Dallas Fan Days events under the same management, Fan Expo Dallas focuses on comic book artists, writers, and publishers. These events usually also feature question and answer sessions, a large dealers room, and autograph-signing with a number of famous comic and media guests. The event is produced by Informa doing business as Fan Expo HQ.

History 
In 2002, Ben Stevens, producer of the Sci-Fi Expo (1994–present), and Philip Wise, owner of rebelscum.com and theforce.net, brought on consultant Mark Walters (of the defunct Dallas Fantasy Fair, who had staged the Dallas Comic & Toy Fest from 2000 to 2002) and produced the first Dallas Comic Con. The show attracted 5,000 attendees.

Starting with the October 2012 show, Dallas Comic Con expanded to three days. C2 Ventures sold control of Dallas Comic Con, Sci-Fi Expo, and Fan Days to Informa in early 2014.

There was no expo in 2020, caused by the COVID-19 pandemic.

Locations 
To date, the Dallas Comic Con has been held at one of four locations. The first three locations were in the suburbs of Dallas, Texas. Early editions were held at the Plano Centre in Plano, Texas, or the Richardson Civic Center in Richardson, Texas. Beginning in May 2011, the event relocated to the Irving Convention Center at Las Colinas in Irving, Texas. In May 2014, the Dallas Comic Con relocated to the Kay Bailey Hutchison Convention Center in downtown Dallas. Dallas Fan Days events remain at the Irving Convention Center.

Event history

See also 
 Dallas Fantasy Fair

References

External links 

Multigenre conventions
Comics conventions in the United States
Festivals in Dallas
Conventions in Texas
Science fiction conventions in the United States
Recurring events established in 2002
2002 establishments in Texas